Charles August Conrady (October 9, 1853 – March 16, 1919) was an American judge and politician from New York.

Life
Charles was born on October 9, 1853, in the old 25th Ward of Brooklyn, New York. He was the son of John Peter Conrady (1809-1893) and Madeline Schneider (1811-1888), German immigrants from the Duchy of Nassau.

Charles initially worked as a coach maker and carriage painter. In 1878, he was appointed to be assistant keeper of the Municipal Building. He later moved to Bath Beach and was elected three times as justice of the peace in New Utrecht, twice as justice of the Court of Special Sessions (later the County Court), making him the first Republican judge elected in the town.

In 1891, Charles was elected to the New York State Assembly, where he represented the Kings County 12th District. He served in the Assembly in 1892. He was then appointed Chief Deputy Collector of Internal Revenue for the Brooklyn 2nd District in 1893, followed by four years as chief clerk of the Third District Municipal Court.

Charles was elected back to the State Assembly in 1906, this time representing the Kings County 16th District. He served in 1907.

Charles died on March 16, 1919, in Bushwick Hospital following an operation. He is buried in Evergreens Cemetery.

References

External links
 The New York Red Book. United States, Williams Press, 1892. P. 118.
The New York Red Book. United States, Williams Press, 1907. P. 111.
C. A. Conrady Dies; Republican Leader in The Brooklyn Daily Eagle on March 17, 1919.
Political Graveyard

1853 births
1919 deaths
Republican Party members of the New York State Assembly
Politicians from Brooklyn
Burials at the Cemetery of the Evergreens
American justices of the peace
American people of German descent
19th-century American judges